This article displays the rosters for the participating teams at the 2011 Supertaça Compal.

Benfica

FC do Porto

Primeiro de Agosto

Recreativo do Libolo

External links
Interbasket Forum Page

References

Supertaça Compal squads